Adam Krajewski (4 October 1929 – 25 October 2000) was a Polish fencer. He competed in the individual and team épée events at the 1952 Summer Olympics.

References

External links
 
 
 

1929 births
2000 deaths
Polish male fencers
Olympic fencers of Poland
Fencers at the 1952 Summer Olympics
Sportspeople from Lviv
People from Lwów Voivodeship